Mary Bea Porter-King (born December 4, 1949) is an American professional golfer who played on the LPGA Tour.

Porter was born in Everett, Washington. She attended Arizona State University, where she played four sports; golf, basketball, volleyball, and softball. She was inducted into the Arizona State Sports Hall of Fame in 2001.

Porter turned professional in 1973 and joined the LPGA Tour after winning the qualifying school tournament in June 1973. She won once on the LPGA Tour in 1975.

During a qualifying round for the 1988 Samaritan Turquoise Classic, Porter saved the life of a drowning boy at a home adjacent to the fairway.

Porter-King moved to Hawaii in 1989 after her marriage and helped found the Hawaii State Junior Golf Association. She was inducted into the Hawaii Golf Hall of Fame in 2004.

Porter-King was awarded the 2011 PGA First Lady of Golf Award by the PGA of America.

Professional wins

LPGA Tour wins (1)

References

External links
Profile on 808golf.com

American female golfers
Arizona State Sun Devils women's golfers
LPGA Tour golfers
Golfers from Washington (state)
Golfers from Hawaii
Sportspeople from Everett, Washington
People from Lihue, Hawaii
1949 births
Living people